Urszula Irena Krupa (born 20 October 1949 in Łódź) is a Polish politician and Member of the European Parliament (MEP) for the Łódź Voivodeship with the League of Polish Families, part of the Independence and Democracy and sits on the European Parliament's Committee on Women's Rights and Gender Equality
and its Committee on the Environment, Public Health and Food Safety.

Krupa is also a member of the Delegation for relations with South Africa and a substitute for the Delegation to the EU-Mexico Joint Parliamentary Committee.

Education
 1984: Physician (1973), specialisation in Anaesthesiology and Resuscitation 1st stage (1977), 2nd stage (1984), Doctor of Medicine at the Medical Academy of Łódz
 1994: Post-graduate Catholic studies in journalism at the Catholic Broadcasting organisation 'Radio Maryja'
 2003: Editor at Radio Maryja in Toruń (1995), lecturer at the Higher College of Social and Media Culture in Toruń
 Assistant (1975) tutor (1986) lecturer (2001) Łódz Medical Academy
 2003: Chairman of the Voivodship Administration of the League of Polish Families

Career
 2001-2004: Member of Parliament of the Polish Republic

See also
 2004 European Parliament election in Poland

External links
 
 

1949 births
Living people
Politicians from Łódź
League of Polish Families MEPs
Women MEPs for Poland
MEPs for Poland 2004–2009
MEPs for Poland 2014–2019